The AirAsia Philippine Patriots (originally known as the Philippine Patriots) were a professional basketball team that played in the ASEAN Basketball League. It was the first team from the Philippines to play in the ASEAN Basketball League (ABL) and one of the teams that played in the inaugural season of the ABL. The team was co-owned by Michael "Mikee" Romero and businessman Antonio O. Cojuangco, Jr.

The Patriots played their home games at the Ynares Sports Arena in Pasig. During its first season, some games were held at the Filoil Flying V Arena in San Juan. Both are located in Metro Manila.

The Patriots were the first ABL champions, winning the 2010 ABL Playoffs (playing as the Philippine Patriots).  Shortly after, the "AirAsia" name was added to the team after Romero and Cojuangco became investors in Philippines AirAsia airline.

On July 30, 2012, Romero purchased the Powerade Tigers Philippine Basketball Association (PBA) franchise to be rechristened as the GlobalPort Batang Pier.  Romero opted to focus on his new PBA team and the Patriots did not return for the 2013 ABL season.

Season-by-season records

Achievements (2009-10)

Final roster

Notable players

Patriots in the PBA
Players that played first for the Patriots before playing in the PBA:
Nonoy Baclao
Junjun Cabatu
Elmer Espiritu
Jerwin Gaco
Kelvin Gregorio
Khasim Mirza

Patriots with prior PBA experience:
Froilan Baguion
Egay Billones
Alex Crisano
Christian Coronel
Benedict Fernandez
Jonathan Fernandez
Allan Salangsang
Rob Wainwright
Warren Ybañez

Imports
 Jason Dixon
 Gabe Freeman
 Brandon Powell
 Steve Thomas
 Rasheim Wright
 Donald Little
 Nakiea Miller
 Anthony Johnson
 Chris Alexander

See also
Harbour Centre Batang Pier (Philippine Basketball League team)
GlobalPort Batang Pier (Philippine Basketball Association team)

References

External links
http://www.aseanbasketballleague.com/teams/view/3/airasia-philippine-patriots

ASEAN Basketball League teams
Defunct basketball teams in the Philippines
Basketball teams established in 2009
Basketball teams disestablished in 2012